The Blazing Trail, known in the United Kingdom as The Forged Will, is a 1949 American Western film directed by Ray Nazarro and starring Charles Starrett.

Cast list

 Charles Starrett as The Durango Kid (aka Steve Allan)
 Marjorie Stapp as Janet Masters
 Fred F. Sears as Luke Masters
 Steve Darrell as Sam Brady
 Jock Mahoney as Full House Patterson
 Trevor Bardette as Jess Williams
 Hank Penny as Musician
 Slim Duncan as Musician
 Smiley Burnette as Smiley Burnette
 Steve Pendleton as Kirk Brady
 Robert Malcolm as Old Mike Brady
 John Cason as Colton
 Frank McCarroll as Citizen
 John Merton as Citizen

Production
This picture was one of 65 "Durango Kid" films Starrett made for Columbia. The first two were made in 1940, while the remainder were made between 1945 and 1952 (when Starrett retired). Production on the film began in late January 1949, and was finished in early February. There were several songs in the film, performed by Burnette, Duncan, and Penny. They were: "You Put Me on My Feet" and "Extra, Extra!," both with music and lyrics by Smiley Burnette; "Cheer Up," music and lyrics by Slim Duncan and Hank Penny; and "Want a Gal From Texas," music and lyrics by George LaVerne and Floyd Bartlett. The picture was rated A-1, suitable for all audiences, by the National Legion of Decency.

Reception
Motion Picture Daily gave the film a positive review, although they did find a flaws in the production, direction and writing. They extolled Starrett's performance, stating he "plays the Durango Kid in a roaringly-paced Western which, despite a few shortcomings, shapes up as good, exciting entertainment for action-film fans. Their issue came back with certain flashback scene, and the use of Starrett inserting narrative dialogue into the action. They highlighted the music insertions by Penny, Duncan and Burnette.

References

External links 
 
 
 The Blazing Trail on YouTube

1949 Western (genre) films
1949 films
American Western (genre) films
American black-and-white films
Columbia Pictures films
Films directed by Ray Nazarro
1940s American films